Recoletos is one of the six wards (barrios) of Salamanca in Madrid, Spain.

Places of interest
National Archaeological Museum of Spain
National library

Wards of Madrid
Salamanca (Madrid)